Frantz may refer to:
 Frantz (given name), a masculine given name (and list of people with the given name)
 Frantz (surname), a surname (and list of people with the surname)
 Frantz (Coppélia), a character in Coppélia
 Frantz (film), a 2016 French film
 The Frantz Manufacturing Company, a manufacturer of conveyor systems

See also 
 D.E. Frantz House, a historic building in Aspen, Colorado
 Frans (disambiguation)
 Franz (disambiguation)
 Frantzen (disambiguation)